Regavim is a kibbutz in northern Israel. Located near Umm al-Fahm, it falls under the jurisdiction of Menashe Regional Council.

Etymology
The name Regavim is taken from the Hebrew word “regev,” meaning a very small piece of land, lit. "patch of soul," a word used in a Zionist poem about reclaiming the Land of Israel, "dunam by dunam, regev by regev."

History
The kibbutz group was established in 1947 by immigrants from Italy and North Africa who were members of the Habonim Dror youth movement. They first settled on the land of the depopulated Palestinian village of Al-Butaymat in July 1948, before moving to the land of another depopulated Palestinian village, Qannir, in 1949.

References

External links

Kibbutz website

Kibbutzim
Kibbutz Movement
Populated places established in 1947
1947 establishments in Mandatory Palestine
Populated places in Haifa District